Milan Marković (born 20 January 1980) is volleyball player in Podgorica.

He was member of Serbia and Montenegro national team from 2001 to 2005. From 2006 he played for Montenegro national team.

He was a member of the national team representing Serbia and Montenegro at the 2004 Summer Olympics in Athens. He won a silver medal in the 2005 FIVB Volleyball World League and a bronze medal 2004.

References

 http://www.fivb.org/EN/volleyball/competitions/WorldLeague/2004/Teams/Team_Roster.asp?code=SCG&sm=60
 http://www.fivb.org/EN/volleyball/competitions/WorldLeague/2005/Teams/Team_Roster.asp?TEAM=SCG&sm=54
 https://web.archive.org/web/20150924144929/http://www.scoresway.com/?sport=volleyball&page=player&id=969
 https://web.archive.org/web/20131029193522/http://www.cev.lu/competition-area/PlayerDetails.aspx?TeamID=8009&PlayerID=19692&ID=566
 http://www.fivb.org/EN/volleyball/competitions/WorldLeague/2005/Teams/VB_Player_b.asp?Team=SCG&No=17

1980 births
Living people
Sportspeople from Podgorica
Montenegrin men's volleyball players
Serbia and Montenegro men's volleyball players
Olympic volleyball players of Serbia and Montenegro
Olympiacos S.C. players
Volleyball players at the 2004 Summer Olympics